The Titas River ( Titās; also Romanized Titash) is a transboundary river that merges into the Meghna river and forms part of the Surma-Meghna River System. Titas starts its journey from the Tripura State, with Haora as one of its right tributaries. Bangladesh's first Y-shaped bridge is over this river connecting Comilla and Brahmanbaria.

Geography
Titas Gas, the biggest natural gas reserve of Bangladesh located in Brahmanbaria, which supplies gas to capital Dhaka, is named after this river.
One of the offshoots of the Meghna river is also
named as the Titas which branches out from the
Meghna at Chatlapur and again meets the
Meghna at Nabinagar Upazila The river has become narrow and shallow in many places due to siltation.

Depiction in popular culture 
Titash Ekti Nadir Naam (A River Called Titas) is a 1956 novel by Bengali writer Adwaita Mallabarman and adapted into the 1973 film of the same name by Ritwik Ghatak. It is a depiction of the lives of a fishing community dependent on the Titas River.

References 

Rivers of Bangladesh
International rivers of Asia
Rivers of Tripura
Rivers of India
Rivers of Chittagong Division